Johan Anders Linder (20 November 1783 – 1 January 1877) was a Swedish clergyman who was also an artist, a writer and an architect in Umeå.

Life

Linder was born in Bygdeå in 1783. His father died and his mother brought him up to be a minister. He obtained his first position in Umeå as a minister in northern Sweden in 1811. Linder and his wife were involved in the social life of the town where they lived and Linder also obtained work as an architect. Linder was also an accomplished artist.  Baggböle manor, which he designed in 1846 as residence for the managing director of the water powered sawmill at Baggböle, is a wooden building made to look like a stone mansion.

Linder obtained other commissions in the 1840s and 1850s for more buildings. The mansion he had built in 1846 was made a listed building in 1964. The former manager's mansion is now near an arboretum and the house is used for conferences and as a restaurant.

Linder later designed a similar mansion to the one he designed at Baggböle saw mill but at Dalkarlså Folk High School (now Umeå Folk High School) in 1849.

Linder was also a writer, and a series of essays he wrote entitled On Swedish Lapp Territories and Their Inhabitants recorded some important cultural texts for the Sami people. The articles he wrote were published between 1849 and 1854. He quoted from a text titled  (Sons of the Sun; in Sami), which had been written by Anders Fjellner, the Sami priest at Sorsele. Linder's publication was important and it was quickly re-published in Swedish, English, Finnish and German. None of the original texts belonging to Fjellner survived, making Linder's publication important.

Linder died in Umeå parish in 1877.

References

1783 births
1877 deaths
People from Umeå
Swedish architects